Klausner is a surname, and may refer to:

Abraham Klausner (Austrian rabbi), 14th-century rabbi
Joseph Klausner (1874–1958), Jewish scholar
Ida Klausner, maiden name of Ida Roland (1881–1951), Austrian and German actress
Hubert Klausner (1892–1939), Austrian politician
Margot Klausner (1905–1975), German-Israeli writer and filmmaker
Abraham Klausner (1915–2007), Jewish United States Army captain and chaplain
Amos Klausner, birth name of Amos Oz (1939–2018), Israeli writer and novelist.
R. Gary Klausner (born 1941), American federal judge.
Richard Klausner (born 1950s), American scientist
Harriet Klausner (1952–2015), American book reviewer
Michael Klausner (born 1954), American scholar.
Laura Janner-Klausner (born 1963), British rabbi
Julie Klausner (born 1978), American comedian
Josh Klausner, American screenwriter
Howard Klausner, American filmmaker and writer
Judah Klausner, American composer and inventor